The Special Warfare Combatant-Craft Crewmen (SWCC ) is a United States Naval Special Warfare Command team that operates and maintains small craft for special operations missions, particularly those in support of the U.S. Navy SEALs. 

SWCC sailors are an assault force that go through a special training program based at Naval Amphibious Base Coronado. SWCC are trained in boating and weapons tactics, techniques, and procedures that focus on clandestine infiltration and exfiltration of SEALs and other special operations forces.

History

Special boat teams can trace their history back to the PT boats of World War II. Motor Torpedo Boat Squadron Three rescued General Douglas MacArthur (and later the Filipino president Manuel L. Quezon) from the Philippines after the Japanese invasion and then participated in guerrilla actions until American resistance ended with the fall of Corregidor. PT boats subsequently participated in most of the campaigns in the Southwest Pacific by conducting and supporting joint/combined reconnaissance, blockade, sabotage, and raiding missions as well as attacking Japanese shore facilities, shipping, and combatants.  PT boats were used in the European Theater beginning in April 1944 to support the Office of Strategic Services in the insertion of espionage and French Resistance personnel and for amphibious landing deception. 

The development of a robust riverine warfare swift boats capability during the Vietnam War produced the forerunner of the modern special warfare combatant-craft crewman. In 1966 River Patrol Force (Task Force 116) operated River Patrol Boats (PBR) conducting counterinsurgency operations in the Mekong Delta region of Vietnam. UDTs delivered a small watercraft far up the Mekong River into Laos. UDTs supported the Amphibious Ready Groups operating on South Vietnam's rivers. UDTs manned riverine patrol craft and went ashore to demolish obstacles and enemy bunkers.  A SEAL Platoon was assigned to each of the five River Squadrons inserted and extracted from their patrol area by PBRs. In July 1968 Light SEAL Support Craft (LSSC) began replacing PBRs as their primary support craft. Mobile Support Teams (MST 1-3) provided combat craft support for SEAL operations, as did patrol boat, river (PBR) and patrol craft, fast (PCF) sailors. In February 1964. Boat Support Unit One was established under Naval Operations Support Group, Pacific to operate the newly reinstated fast patrol boat (PTF) program and to operate high-speed craft in support of NSW forces. In late 1964 the first PTFs arrived in Da Nang, Vietnam. In 1965, Boat Support Squadron One began training patrol craft fast crews for Vietnamese coastal patrol and interdiction operations. As the Vietnam mission expanded into the riverine environment, additional craft, tactics, and training evolved for riverine patrol and SEAL support.

SWCC detachments have participated in nearly every major conflict since then, particularly in the Persian Gulf theatre during the 1987–1988 period of conflict, the Invasion of Panama Operation Just Cause 1989-1990 and the 1990-1991 Gulf War to the more recent War on Terrorism along with counter narcotics operations in South and Central America. In August 1996 while attached to  during counter drug operations in Colombia, a SWCC team came under attack in the Antioquia Valley region by members of FARC, Colombia's revolutionary movement, while conducting field operations. Six team members held off a force of approximately 150 rebels. The battle lasted for three days and nights and members of the team found themselves surrounded and cut off from each other on several occasions. Short of ammunition and water, The team held on until first light on day three, regrouped and counter-attacked, punching a hole in the FARC defense line and linking up with Colombian special forces sent there to assist them. An estimated 43 FARC rebels were killed during the battle and four were captured with only one team member being wounded. Members of the team were cited for heroism and bravery.

Special warfare boat operator (SB) rating

On 1 October 2006, due to the ongoing Global War on Terrorism, NSW established the special warfare operator (SO) ratings (for SEALs) and special warfare boat operators (SB) ratings (for SWCCs).

Special warfare combatant-craft crewman warfare specialty

Another important development was the recognition of the knowledge, skills, and training of SWCC crewmen as a warfare specialty, represented by the NEC 5352 and later denoted by the award of a military device or service badge.

For a brief period qualified sailors were awarded no device; boat captain-qualified sailors wore the small craft insignia originally created for and worn by riverine sections during the Vietnam War. Still earlier than this, the small craft pin was worn by those with the 9533 NEC. Many other units within the Navy awarded the small craft badge, and there was controversy regarding the original intent associated with its creation. The matter has been somewhat settled as the small craft badge has recently been awarded only to conventional riverine units under the NECC and SWCC boat captains, who wear it in addition to the SWCC device.

Training

To become a special warfare combatant-craft crewman, a service member must apply and be accepted to special programs, complete a special programs specific boot camp (called 800 divisions) alongside SEAL (SO) candidates, Explosive Ordnance Disposal (EOD) candidates, Diver (ND) Candidates and Aviation Air Rescue (AIRR) candidates. SWCC and SEAL candidates then go together to Naval Special Warfare Preparatory School (NSWPS also called BUD/S Prep) in Great Lakes Chicago. SWCC and SEAL candidates then move to Coronado, California to attend Basic Underwater Demolition Orientation/or SEAL Orientation (BO) alongside SEAL candidates. Upon testing out of BO, SWCC candidates then split off and attend Basic Crewman Selection (BCS) while their SEAL candidate counterparts attend the 1st phase of BUD/S. 1st phase BUD/S completes hell week on the fourth week, and then BCS will go through the Tour on the fifth week. SWCC candidates then go on to Basic Crewman Training(BCT) while their SO candidate counterparts go to BUD/S 2nd phase.  Following this, SWCC candidates will undergo Crewman Qualification Training (CQT) and then go on to specialized individual schools. The main difference between a SWCC pipeline compared to SEALs is they become combat swimmer qualified rather than the required combat dive qualified portion SEALs go through in BUD/S.

Pipeline
Requirements to enter training:
Meet specific eyesight requirements: 20/40 best eye; 20/70 worst eye; correctable to 20/25 with no color blindness
Meet the minimum Armed Services Vocational Aptitude Battery (ASVAB) score: AR+VE=103, MC=51
Be 30 years old or younger; min. 17
Be a U.S. citizen

Initial SWCC training consists of the following:
 Eight week Naval Special Warfare Prep School-(BUD/S Prep) Great Lakes, Illinois
 Three weeks BUD/S Orientation at Naval Amphibious Base Coronado, California
 7 weeks Basic Crewman Selection (BCS) at the Naval Special Warfare Center, NAB Coronado.
 7 weeks Basic Crewman Training (BCT) at the Naval Special Warfare Center, NAB Coronado.
 Twenty-one-week SWCC Crewman Qualification Training (CQT) at Naval Amphibious Base Coronado

Screening
Assignment to basic crewman training depends on passing the physical screening, which requires the following minimal standards:
Swim 500 yards under 13 minutes (Side Stroke / Breast Stroke)
Rest 5 minutes
50 push-ups within 2 minutes
Rest 2 minutes
50 sit-ups within 2 minutes
Rest 2 minutes
6 pull-ups within 2 minutes
Rest 5 minutes
1.5-mile run under 12 minutes
Pass a basic underwater demolition/SEAL physical fitness screening test in boot camp and in the delayed entry program in order to qualify

Optimum numbers are as follows:
Swim 500 yards under 10 minutes (Side Stroke / Breast Stroke)
Rest 10 minutes
70 push-ups within 2 minutes
Rest 2 minutes
70 sit-ups within 2 minutes
Rest 2 minutes
10 pull-ups within 2 minutes
Rest 10 minutes
1.5-mile run under 10 minutes
Pass a basic underwater demolition/SEAL physical fitness screening test in boot camp and in the delayed entry program in order to qualify

Naval Special Warfare Preparatory School (BUD/s Prep)
The Naval Special Warfare Preparatory School (NSW Prep) or "BUD/s Prep" phase takes place at Great Lakes, Illinois. The curriculum at NSW Prep lasts for two months. NSW Prep has one goal: Improve a SWCC candidates physical readiness for the grueling trials of Basic Crewman Selection (BCS). Students are introduced to the obstacle course, soft sand runs, knot tying, open water swimming, water rescue, drown-proofing, and basic navigational skills. Many candidates will quit during the first three weeks. After they pass Pre-BUD/s, candidates will then get sent to BUD/S Orientation at Naval Amphibious Base Coronado, California. Here they will spend the rest of their training and the next three weeks preparing for their pipeline along with their respective SEAL candidates.

Basic Crewman Selection (BCS)

Instructors of the SWCC Basic Crewman Selection course train, develop, and assess SWCC candidates in physical conditioning, water competency, teamwork, and mental tenacity. This course starts with a three-week indoctrination. The SWCC basic crewman training is 7 weeks long. Physical conditioning with running, swimming, and calisthenics grows harder as the weeks progress. Students abilities, mental fortitude and teamwork skills are tested during an arduous 4-day evolution involving little sleep, constant exposure to the elements, underway boat and swimming events, and a test of navigational skills and boat tactics. This test is referred to as the Crucible or "The Tour". SWCC students participate in weekly timed runs, timed obstacle course evolutions, pool, bay and ocean swims, and learn small-boat seamanship. Upon the completion of SWCC Basic Crewman Selection(BCS), students advance to Basic Crewman Training(BCT).

Crewman Qualification Training (CQT) 

Instructors of crewman qualification training develop, train and qualify SWCC candidates in basic weapons, seamanship, casualty care, and small unit tactics. This phase of training is 21 weeks long. CQT is broken down into two phase Basic and Advanced. During the Basic portion, candidates are trained in first aid, small arms, heavy weapons, basic combat skills, engineering, and towing and trailering procedures for SWCC boats. Candidates must pass tests on all of these subjects in order to move onto the next phase.

In the Advanced training segment in CQT, sailors are trained in communications, Tactical Combat Casualty Control (TCCC), navigation and boat handling, mission planning and execution, live fire while underway on the boats. The student also receives an introduction to the NSW mission planning cycle, enabling him to participate in the planning, briefing, execution, and debriefing of an NSW mission from their tasking, to launch point, and on to their combat objective, where students apply all the techniques they have acquired during training. Physical training here is geared to prepare the student to meet the requirements of the operational special boat teams. CQT concentrates on teaching maritime navigation, communications, waterborne patrolling techniques, marksmanship and engineering, as well as small unit tactics and close-quarters combat. SWCC, will also attend Jump school around this time. As well as SERE Level C school upon finishing CQT.

Candidates that have made it through the pipeline are awarded their SWCC pins, designating them as a Special Warfare Boat Operator (SB) rating. They are subsequently assigned to a Special Boat Team to begin preparing for their first deployment.

Due to the training and prerequisites involved in qualification, SWCC is recognized by those within the broader realm of "small boat" operations as the premier tactical boat teams of the armed forces due to their extremely difficult qualification to obtain with about a 65-70% attrition rate.

Due in part to the extremely difficult training and operating environment of SWCCs, they are qualified to operate jointly with other armed forces (particularly those within USSOCOM such as SEALs, Special Forces, MARSOC, AFSOC, and DSF). They operate in inclement weather and sea state, evade and fight on land as a contingency, and perform maritime special operations missions such as direct action, recon, ship boarding or vessel board, search and seizure, and sea-to-land support using a broad array of vessels and armaments.

Further training

SWCCs invariably receive broad individual and detachment in-house training and attend schools as needed to support Naval Special Warfare Command. Before reporting to a team, all SWCCs must attend a 12-week language course, where they must learn a language assigned to them according to the needs of their respective teams. All, SWCC will go to Naval Small Craft Instruction and Technical Training School to receive tactical boat training.

Every SWCC receives basic medic assistant training for combat lifesaving skills. After reporting to the teams SWCCs may attend schools relative to their respective individual specialities and or mission readiness schools such as desert survival, jungle survival, cold water survival, special operations combat medic training, naval special warfare combat fighting course, fast-rope, air assault, designated marksman school, tactical driving, and many others offered within Naval Special warfare.

Advanced equipment
SWCC, constantly go to new U.S. Department of Defense schools according to the needs of their respective team and adaptable mission set. SWCCs, also receive an extensive in-house training with the latest technology in order to advance the operator with efforts to maintain operational advancements in Naval Special Warfare combat readiness.

These areas of technology could be in advanced radio communications, joint terminal attack controller, advanced weapons systems, advanced navigation systems, small unmanned aerial systems (SUAS), technical surveillance operations, data analysis, signals intelligence/electronic warfare (SIGINT/EW), etc.), photographic image capture, outboard, diesel, and waterjet engines. These areas are on an ongoing adaptable basis in order to keep skills fresh and synergies alive.

Combat medic training

BLS & Medic Assistant Training

Combat first aid and lifesaving, emergency response, emergency life support, evaluation, water search and rescue, stabilization, packaging, transport, and MEDEVAC skills are of vital importance to all forces within the special operations community, since they operate far from medical assets and rely on their independent capabilities. SWCC platforms provide a unique opportunity to provide a "next layer" of pre-hospital medical stabilization and MEDEVAC capability between the field and helicopter/air transport. Inbound casualties are a likely scenario, and the nature of their missions places them at a high risk of casualty as well.

Because of this, all SWCCs receive ongoing and repeated in-house training in combat first aid, basic life support, airway management and oxygen administration, trauma care, limited emergency medication administration, and IV therapy – a set of skills roughly analogous to civilian BLS, BTLS, and EMT-B qualification, and thus quite arguably conferring on every SWCC the unofficial distinction of being a combat lifesaver by the general definition. However, the SWCC community generally recognizes these members as "medic assistants" to distinguish them from the lead [para]medic, whose primary function as a professional paramedic is continually reinforced by years of training and experience.

Many NSW medics originally came from the hospital corpsman rating. Thus, while not all hospital corpsmen are combat medics, and not all combat medics are hospital corpsmen, all SWCCs are by the general definition trained combat medics – particularly after repeated workup cycles and ongoing training have refined their skills to a level comparable with conventional combat medics and civilian EMTs.

Some SWCCs have attended (and continue to attend) civilian EMT or paramedic courses (either funded or completed through their own ambition); and several of these men have enjoyed an ad hoc, de facto status as "docs" serving in their detachments as medics in the past.

A more recent development is that designated SWCC medics attend the Special Operations Combat Medic course of instruction, and attend Naval Special Warfare-specific-based courses. As of 2012, most attend 18 Delta Fort Bragg's special operations medic course.

NSW combat medics and lead medics

Within the NSW community, the title of SWCC detachment "medic" applies to SB (SWCC) members who have completed Special Operations Combat Medic course and been designated as lead medics for a detachment. This training is equivalent or exceeds civilian EMT-P certification, a civilian qualification which they are indeed eligible to test for immediately after training. They are able to initiate and administer IV fluids and medications independently and perform certain minor surgeries and stitches in the field at their own discretion. They can intubate and administer oxygen and other interventions done by paramedics.

These men are among the rare exceptions to the general rule that "all Navy combat medics are hospital corpsmen". Because of changes leading to the establishment of the SB rating, non-corpsmen SWCCs attend the course, become qualified NSW combat medics, and serve primarily as medics for the rest of their careers within Naval Special Warfare, in addition to performing the various other roles of a SWCC crewman.

Special warfare combat medics are the primary or lead combat medics in a SWCC detachment. Previously, SEAL corpsmen served as the lead medics in larger SWCC detachments and managed shoreside clinics at special boat teams, managing sick call, training all SWCCs as medic assistants, and rendering emergency medical care to both SWCCs and SEALs while deployed in the field. These SEALs contributed greatly to the special boat teams and the professional development of their SWCC combat medic counterparts. While readiness is still achieved by pooling of crew skills through medic assistant quals, SWCCs are now taking on lead medic roles within their community capitalizing on the benefit of a stable maritime platform, additional medical equipment, and the ability to provide longer-term stabilization of casualties on board their craft.

Aerial deployment training 

Maritime craft aerial deployment system

SWCC Personnel are trained military parachutists and are practiced in the deployment of their watercraft using the Maritime Craft Aerial Deployment System (MCADS).

Serving as a force multiplier, the MCADS capability enables Naval Special Warfare Sailors to rapidly deploy anywhere in the world in a maritime environment. The system deploys an 11-meter RIB (Rigid Inflatable Boat) rigged with four large parachutes from the back of a C-130 or C-17 at approximately 3,500 feet. Approximately four SWCCs immediately follow the boat out of the plane and parachute to the immediate proximity of where the boat lands in the water. Within 20-minutes the SWCCs have the boat unpacked and rigged to get underway to deliver an element of SOF (Special Operations Force) Operators to any potential target of interest, or to conduct their own mission.

Maritime external air transportation system
SWCC Personnel are now more frequently attending the U.S. Army Air Assault School. A common operation the SWCC train for involving helicopters is called Maritime External Air Transportation System (MEATS).

Special Boat Teams use the MEATS insertion and extraction delivery system. MEATS allows an Army CH-47 helicopter to hover over a craft used by SWCC to be rigged to the underbelly of the helicopters with slings. The Combatant-Craft Crewman will then ascend a ladder dropped down from the helicopter into the craft.  Once all the SWCC are on board, the CH-47 will extract the craft from the water. A SWCC craft can also be inserted into a maritime environment giving the SWCC a longer range on land or at sea.

A variant of the MEATS insertion method was seen in the movies Act of Valor and Apocalypse Now.

Mission
Operate and maintain inventory of state-of-the-art, high-performance vessels used to support SEALs and on other special operations. SWCC provide a dedicated, rapid mobility mission in shallow water areas where large ships cannot operate.

Their capabilities of Direct Action include mobility through coastline or rivers (such as strikes, captures, and ship take downs by Visit, Board, Search and Seizure, Maritime Interdiction Operations, Maritime Search and Rescue, Waterside Security, Coastal Patrol, high risk personnel recovery and force protective services. SWCC emphasize being mobility and weapons experts; due to this, in recent years they have taken a high level of training in tactical driving and convoy operations.

From a reconnaissance and technology standpoint, their unique capability with the advanced equipment of their craft allow them to operate Intelligence, Surveillance & Reconnaissance (ISR) space of gathering and collecting important data about enemy military installations and shipping traffic in coastal areas.
The amphibious reconnaissance aspect allows anti-sabotage detection and support to the ground personnel.

SWCC, also have other unique capabilities such as search and rescue both combat and humanitarian assistance. As well as assisting law enforcement agencies and training various foreign units. All SWCCs are by the general definition trained combat medics/lifesavers.

SWCC Units

Naval Special Warfare Group 4

Qualification Insignia

The special warfare combatant-craft crewman insignia is a military qualification badge of the United States Navy which was first conceived in 1996, though the design was not approved for wear until 2001.  The insignia is authorized for wear by volunteer members of special boat teams (formerly special boat units) under U.S. Naval Special Warfare Command. Candidates must pass the SWCC basic crewman training and crewman qualification training.

On 19 August 2016, the current SWCC qualification insignia was replaced with three separate insignias to denote the level of qualification achieved individually by SWCC sailors.  The new insignias are SWCC Basic, SWCC Senior, and SWCC Master.  The SWCC Basic Insignia is a two and one-half by one and one-fourth inch silver matte metal pin showing a background of a cocked flintlock pistol, a crossed naval enlisted cutlass, and a Mark V Special Operations Craft atop a bow wave.  The SWCC Senior Insignia incorporates an upright anchor in the background of the SWCC Basic Insignia.  The SWCC Master Insignia incorporates a banner with three gold stars on the upper portion of the anchor from the SWCC Senior Insignia.

Gallery

See also
 Navy Expeditionary Combat Command
 United States Navy SEALs
 Coast Guard Squadron One
 Mark V Special Operations Craft
 Special Operations Craft – Riverine (SOC-R)
 Small unit riverine craft
 Enlisted Expeditionary Warfare Specialist
 List of United States Navy enlisted warfare designations
 Badges of the United States Navy
 Military badges of the United States
 Uniforms of the United States Navy
 Obsolete badges of the United States military

References

Further reading

External links

U.S. Navy SEAL & SWCC official website

United States Naval Special Warfare Command
United States Navy ratings
Riverine warfare